The 2012 Women's International Super Series Hockey 9's was the second edition of the women's field hockey tournament. The tournament was held at the Perth Hockey Stadium between 22–25 November 2012 in Perth, Australia. A total of three teams competed for the title.

The tournament was held alongside the men's competition. 

Australia won the tournament for the second time, defeating Australia U–21 2–0 in the final.

Participating nations
A total of four teams competed for the title:

Officials
The following umpires were appointed by the FIH and Hockey Australia to officiate the tournament:

 Sarah Allanson (AUS)
 Nor Piza Hassan (MAS)
 Kim Kuk-Hee (AUS)

Competition format and rules
The International Super Series Hockey 9's has a unique set of rules varying from standard FIH regulations.

The main variations are as follows:
Matches are played with a maximum of 9 players on the field at any time for each team
Matches are played in 2 halves of 20 minutes
Goals are widened by 1 metre than regulation size

Results

Preliminary round

Fixtures

Classification match

Final

Statistics

Final standings

Goalscorers

References

External links
Official website

International women's field hockey competitions hosted by Australia
2012 in Australian women's field hockey
2012 in Malaysian women's sport
2012 in women's field hockey